Glenn Zorpette is an electrical engineer with IEEE Spectrum Magazine in New York, New York. He was named a Fellow of the Institute of Electrical and Electronics Engineers (IEEE) in 2013 for his contributions to professional communication in electrical and electronic technology.

References

20th-century births
Living people
Fellow Members of the IEEE
Year of birth missing (living people)
Place of birth missing (living people)